The Peruvian recurvebill (Syndactyla ucayalae) is a species of bird in the family Furnariidae. It is found in the western Amazon Basin of Bolivia, Brazil and Peru.

Its natural habitat is subtropical or tropical moist lowland forest. It is threatened by habitat loss.

References

Peruvian recurvebill
Birds of the Amazon Basin
Birds of the Bolivian Amazon
Birds of the Peruvian Amazon
Peruvian recurvebill
Taxonomy articles created by Polbot